Vanuatu competed in the 2010 Commonwealth Games held in Delhi, India, from 3 to 14 October 2010. Vanuatu's Table Tennis Federation has been for many years, honoured to select its players as the flag bearer of the 2010 Commonwealth games. As a result, Yoshua Shing was nominated flag bearer of the 2010 Commonwealth Games. Vanuatu participated in table tennis at the commonwealth games for singles, doubles and mixed events. The events were held at the Yamuna Sports Complex from 4 to 14 October 2010.

Medals
As of end of the 2010 Commonwealth Games, participating in their eight Commonwealth Games, Vanuatuans have never yet won a medal.

Table Tennis Team

Vanuatu's table tennis team consisted of 6 athletes, 3 men and 3 women.
Men
 Ham Lulu
 Randy Benjamin
 Yoshua Shing

Women
 Anolyn Lulu
 Pareina Matariki
 Liopa Santhy

See also
 2010 Commonwealth Games
 2010 Commonwealth Games medal table
 Vanuatu at the Commonwealth Games

References

External links
 Times of India
 Commonwealth Games Federation

Nations at the 2010 Commonwealth Games
Vanuatu at the Commonwealth Games
2010 in Vanuatuan sport